Simcha Jacobovici (born April 4, 1953) is an Israeli-Canadian journalist and documentary film maker.

Biography
Simcha Jacobovici's parents were Holocaust survivors from Iași, Romania. He was born April 4, 1953, in Petah Tikva, Israel. In 1962, the family relocated to Canada.

He earned a B.A. in philosophy and political science (with honors) from McGill University and an M.A. in International Relations from the University of Toronto. From 2015 to 2018 he was an adjunct professor of religious studies at Huntington University, Greater Sudbury, Ontario.

Film career

Jacobovici is a three-time Emmy winner for Outstanding Investigative Journalism. His filmmaking awards include a Certificate of Special Merit from the Academy of Motion Picture Arts and Sciences, a Gold Medal from the International Documentary Festival of Nyon, two US CableACE Awards, a Royal Television Society Award, two Gemini awards, an Alfred I. duPont–Columbia University Award, two Gold Dolphins from the Cannes Corporate Media & TV Awards, a Jack R. Howard Award from the Scripps Howard Awards for In-Depth National and International Coverage, the Norman Bethune Award from the Canadian Medical Association for Excellence in International Health Reporting and, from the Overseas Press Club of America, two Edward R. Murrow Awards and a Carl Spielvogel Award.

In 2017, he was awarded the Gordon Sinclair Award, Canada's highest achievement in Broadcast Journalism, from the Academy of Canadian Cinema and Television.

As an early advocate of airlifting Ethiopian Jews to Israel, he wrote an op-ed piece on the subject for New York Times and made his first documentary, Falasha: Exile of the Black Jews (1983). The Economist credited Jacobovici's documentary as one of the factors leading to the 1984–85 Israeli airlift of Ethiopian Jews to Israel.

Jacobovici's film on the Arab-Israeli conflict, Deadly Currents (1991), won the Genie Award for Best Documentary, a gold medal at the International Documentary Festival of Nyon, and was the runner-up for the Peace Prize at the 1991 Berlin Film Festival and was the only documentary screened in both Israeli army bases and Palestinian Refugee Camps.

Jacobovici has made three documentaries with James Cameron, The Exodus Decoded (2005), The Lost Tomb of Jesus (2007) and Atlantis Rising (2016).

Working with Samuel L. Jackson and LaTanya Richardson Jackson, in 2020 Jacobovici completed the 6 part series Enslaved: The Lost History of the Transatlantic Slave Trade (CBC, Epix, BBC, Fremantle) as Showrunner/Series Director.  Enslaved is the most comprehensive television series ever made on the subject. It tells the epic and tragic story using a modern day quest for sunken slave ships as the springboard to the larger narrative.

Enslaved is being broadcast in 147 countries garnering record ratings and outstanding reviews. Enslaved was nominated for two NAACP Image Awards, including Best Director and Series and won 3 Canadian Screen Awards. It won a "Buzzie" for Best Historical Series at the World Congress of Science and Factual Producers. It was also honored for Outstanding Achievement by the Impact Doc Awards and was named Best Documentary at the International Filmmaker Festival in London. As part of their anti-racism campaign, Enslaved has been screened in the United Nations and the European Parliament. Paris Match has called Enslaved "One small step for man…One giant leap for civil rights!"

His 2022 book, “Enslaved: The Sunken History of the Transatlantic Slave Trade”, written with Sean Kingsley, with a preface by Brenda Jones, was published by Pegasus in New York and distributed by Simon & Schuster worldwide.

He is presently (2022-2023) Showrunner/Series Director on “The Science of Avatar”, a 4-part non-scripted series for Disney+/National Geographic.[

Controversies

Several of Jacobovici's films have sparked controversies. The 1994 film, The Plague Monkeys resulted in the closure of a level 4 lab in Toronto, Canada. James, Brother of Jesus highlighted an ossuary in the private collection of an Israeli antiquities collector, Oded Golan. Golan was accused of forging part of the inscription on a 2,000-year-old bone box/ossuary. Jacobovici and Hershel Shanks (founding editor of Biblical Archaeology Review), stood by their story. In 2012, after 7 years in an Israeli court, Golan was exonerated. 

His most controversial claim is the identification of a tomb in Jerusalem as that of Jesus of Nazareth and his family in the Talpiot Tomb. In 2008, a conference made up of renowned scholars took place in Jerusalem to discuss the thesis of Jacobovici’s film. By the end, a minority of scholars backed the thesis, another minority rejected it and the majority argued that the subject has to be studied further. The proceedings of the conference were published by James H. Charlesworth under the name The Tomb of Jesus and His Family? Exploring Ancient Jewish Tombs Near Jerusalem’s Walls (Eerdmans) (2013).

Investigative archaeology
Over the past decades, Jacobovici has engaged in what he calls "investigative archaeology".

In 2012, Jacobovici investigated a Second Temple-era burial cave in Armon Hanatziv with a camera mounted on a robotic arm. Along with James Tabor, he claimed that the 2,000-year-old cave may be the burial site of disciples of Jesus. Such identification has been rejected by many scholars.

Jacobovici hosted three seasons of The Naked Archaeologist on VisionTV in Canada and The History Channel in the United States. In 2013, the series began to be broadcast on the Israel Broadcast Authority (IBA) Channel 1. The series can be streamed on Amazon and YouTube. A reboot is scheduled for 2023.

Jacobovici has written analysis pieces for The New York Times, International Herald Tribune, The Globe and Mail, Los Angeles Times and other newspapers. At times, he blogs on SimchaJTV, The Times of Israel, The Jerusalem Post and The Huffington Post. Most recently, Jacobovici published a magazine article in the Smithsonian Magazine on the transatlantic slave trade (October 17, 2022).
 
Jacobovici has been interviewed on numerous television shows like Anderson Cooper 360, Larry King Live, ABC Nightline, The Oprah Winfrey Show, NBC Today Show and ABC Good Morning America.

Books 
 
 
 

Jacobovici is also the co-author of two e-books; "Michelangelo's Angels and Demons" and "The James Revelation", published by Zoomerbooks, as a companion to his television series "Biblical Conspiracies".

Filmography

Director
 Enslaved: The Lost History of the Transatlantic Slave Trade (Epix, CBC, Fremantle, 2020)
 Atlantis Rising (National Geographic/Discovery, 2017)
 Bride of God (Science Channel/VisionTV, 2014)
 The Jesus Discovery/The Resurrection Tomb Mystery (2012)
 Secrets of Christianity/Decoding the Ancients (2010)
 The Lost Tomb of Jesus (2007)
 Charging the Rhino (2007)
 The Naked Archaeologist (2006–2010)
 The Exodus Decoded (2005)
 James, Brother of Jesus (2003)
 The Struma (2001)
 Quest for the Lost Tribes (1998)
 Hollywoodism: Jews, Movies & the American Dream (1997)
 Expulsion and Memory: Descendants of the Hidden Jews (1996)
 Bones of Contention (1993)
 Deadly Currents (1991)
 Falasha: Exile of the Black Jews (1983)

Producer
 Enslaved: The Lost History of the Transatlantic Slave Trade (2020)
 The Good Nazi (2019)
 Tales from the Organ Trade (2013)
 Living in the Time of Jesus (2010)
 Yummy Mummy (2005)
 Sex Slaves/The Real Sex Traffic (2005)
 Impact of Terror (2004)
 Tell It Like It Is (2003/04)
 Penn & Teller’s Magic and Mystery Tour (2000)
 Pandemic: Case of the Killer Flu (1999)
 Frozen Hearts (1999)
 Jesus in Russia: An American Holy War (1996)
 The Selling of Innocents (1996)
 Ebola: Inside an Outbreak/The Plague Fighters (1996)
 The Plague Monkeys (1994)
 Bones of Contention (1993)
 AIDS in Africa (1990)

Selected awards 
Canadian Screen Awards, Best History Documentary Program or Series; Barbara Sears Award for Best Editorial Research; Best Photography Documentary or Factual, 2021
World Congress of Science & Factual Producers Buzzie, Best History Program – Long Format, 2020
Impact DOCS Award, Outstanding Achievement/Award of Excellence: Documentary Feature/Award of Excellence: Cinematography/Award of Excellence: History, Biographical, 2020
NAACP Image Awards, Outstanding Documentary, television, Nomination, 2020
NAACP Image Awards, Outstanding Directing in a Documentary, Television or Motion Picture, 2020
London International Filmmakers Festival, Best Feature Documentary, 2020
Academy of Canadian Cinema and Television, Gordon Sinclair Award, 2017
Canadian Association of Journalists Award, Open Broadcast Feature, 2015
Donald Brittain Award for Best Documentary, Canada, 2015, 1997
Edward R. Murrow Award, Overseas Press Club of America, 2014, 2007, 2006
Jack R. Howard Award for Television/Cable In-Depth National and International Coverage, USA, 2014
Norman Bethune Award, Excellence in International Health Reporting, Canadian Medical Association Media Awards, 2014
Gold Award, WorldMedia Festival, Hamburg, Germany 2014
Gold Dolphin, Cannes Corporate Media & TV Awards, France, 2014, 2013
Raven Award, Best Feature Documentary, USA 2013
Special Jury Prize, Nevada International Film Festival, USA, 2013
Best Documentary, Tenerife International Film Festival, Canary Islands, 2013
Banff Rockie Award, Best Social and Humanitarian Program, Canada, 2013
Gold WorldMedal, Most Innovative Production, New York Festivals, USA, 2013
International Golden Panda Nomination, Sichuan TV Festival, China, 2013, 2012
Cine Golden Eagle Award, USA, 2011, 2010
Wilbur Award for Best Documentary, USA, 2010, 2007
Special Jury Prize, Brussels Archaeological Film Festival, 2009
Gemini, Best Host, Canada, Nomination, 2007
Emmy Award, Outstanding Investigative Journalism, USA, 2007, 1997, 1995
British Broadcast Award, Best Documentary Programme, U.K., 2006
Royal Television Society Award, U.K., 2006
BAFTA, Best Single Documentary, U.K., Nomination, 2006
Bulldog Award for Best Documentary, Televisual Magazine, U.K., 2006
Grand Award, Best of the Festival, Best News Program, New York Film Festivals, 2006
Gold Special Jury Award, Worldfest-Houston, 2005
Carl Spielvogel Award, Overseas Press Club, New York, USA, 2005, 2004
Best Documentary, Portland International Film Festival, USA, 2002
Best Science/Technology/Environment Documentary, Hot Docs International Documentary Festival, Canada, 2000
Best Documentary, Jerusalem Film Festival, 1998
Best History Documentary, Hot Docs International Documentary Festival, Canada, 1998
Best Writing, Hot Docs International Documentary Festival, Canada, 1998
Silver Nymph, Monte Carlo Television Festival, 1997
Gemini Award, Best Science Award, Canada, 1997
Gold Plaque, Chicago International Television Awards, 1997
Best Social Documentary, Hot Docs International Documentary Festival, Canada, 1997
Alfred I. duPont Award, Columbia University, 1997
Best Science/Technology/Environment Documentary, Hot Docs International Documentary Festival, 1997
Best Science, Technology, Nature/Environment Documentary, Gemini Awards, 1997
Cable Ace Award, National Academy of Cable Programming, USA, 1997, 1995, 1992
Freddie Award, American Medical Association, 1997
President's Award, Awards of Excellence in Educational Programming, 1996
Golden Sheaf Award, Yorkton Film Festival, 1996
Grand Prize, Visions du Reel, Nyon, 1992
Best Feature Length Documentary, Genie Awards, Canada, 1992
Gold Hugo, Documentary Feature Film, USA, 1992
Gold Hugo, Best Social/Political Documentary, USA, 1990
Certificate of Special Merit, The Academy of Motion Picture Arts and Sciences, 1985
Best Film, HemisFilm Festival, San Antonio, Texas, USA, 1985

Selected documentaries and television programs

Enslaved: The Lost History of the Transatlantic Slave Trade 
Enslaved: The Lost History of the Transatlantic Slave Trade (6x1 hr) documents 400 years of human trafficking from Africa to the "New World". Over 12 million Africans were sold into slavery. At least two million died en route.
Led by Hollywood icon and human rights activist, Samuel L. Jackson, Enslaved tracks Diving With a Purpose (DWP), a collaborating organization of the National Association of Black Scuba Divers, as they locate six sunken slave ships. These efforts serve as springboards to their telling of the stories of the ideology, economics and politics of slavery. It's also a story of resistance, accomplishment and hope.

Atlantis Rising 
In 2016, Jacobovici directed a documentary about Atlantis for the National Geographic Channel; its executive producer was James Cameron. Shot in several places in the Mediterranean (Greece, Sardinia, Malta, Santorini) such as Spain (Cádiz, Huelva, Sevilla, Jaén, Ciudad Real, Badajoz as well as in other undersea places in the Gulf of Cádiz) and the Azores. It premiered on January 29, 2017, on the National Geographic Channel (US) and at National Geographic Spain as "El Resurgir de la Atlántida" on March 5, 2017.

Finding Atlantis 
Jacobovici was involved as executive producer in the production of a documentary that was shown in March 2010 on the National Geographic Channel. He claimed that Atlantis had been found in Spain, and he said that evidence which was found by University of Hartford Professor Richard Freund included the unearthed emblem of Atlantis and he also said that "Tarshish is Atlantis itself".

The Naked Archaeologist 
The television show The Naked Archaeologist was produced for VisionTV in Canada and History International in the US and was hosted and prepared by Jacobovici and Avri Gilad. The show ultimately reviewed biblical stories and then tried to find proof for them by exploring the Holy Land looking for archaeological evidence, making personal inferences and deductions and interviewing scholars and experts. After its original run on VisionTV, it was picked up in the U.S. by The History Channel and its sister network, History International.

The episode "A Nabatean by Any Other Name" won the Special Jury Prize at the 8th International Archaeological Film Festival in Brussels.

The Lost Tomb of Jesus 
The documentary The Lost Tomb of Jesus was co-produced and first broadcast on the Discovery Channel and Vision TV in Canada on March 4, 2007, covering the discovery of the Talpiot Tomb. It was directed by Jacobovici and produced by Felix Golubev and Ric Esther Bienstock, and James Cameron served as executive producer. It was released in conjunction with a book on the same subject, The Jesus Family Tomb, issued in late February 2007 and co-authored by Jacobovici and Charles R. Pellegrino. The documentary and book's claims have been rejected by the overwhelming majority of scholars.

The Exodus Decoded 
The Exodus Decoded, a 2006 History Channel documentary, was created by Jacobovici and the producer/director James Cameron. It explores evidence for the biblical account of the Exodus. Its claims and methods were widely criticized by Biblical scholars and mainstream scientists.

Jacobovici suggests that the Exodus took place around 1500 BC, during the reign of Pharaoh Ahmose I, and that it coincided with the Minoan eruption. In the documentary, the biblical plagues of Egypt are explained as having resulted from that eruption and a related limnic eruption in the Nile Delta. While much of Jacobovici's archaeological evidence for the Exodus comes from Egypt, some comes from Mycenae on Mainland Greece, such as a gold ornament that somewhat resembles the Ark of the Covenant.

Impact of Terror 
The 2004 documentary, produced by Jacobovici and directed by Tim Wolochatiuk, is about Israeli victims of terrorism who were struggling to cope in the aftermath of the August 2001 Sbarro restaurant suicide bombing in Jerusalem.

Quest for the Lost Tribes 
In the 2003 wide-ranging documentary, Jacobovici goes on a worldwide search for the Ten Lost Tribes of Israel and states that there are actually only nine tribes because the remnant of the tribe of Dan was confirmed to be the Beta Israel of Ethiopia. Travelling from western Europe to China and India, Jacobovici finds tantalizing evidence which proves that the "lost tribes" are, like the tribe of Dan, really not lost. The tribe of Dan is the only original tribe of Israel which is not included in the Book of Revelation's list of tribes that are sealed.

The Struma
Ten people were let off the ship in Istanbul, including a woman who had just had a miscarriage, and one man who was the representative of the Mobil Oil Company in Romania and was helped by Mobil's representative in Turkey, Vehbi Koc. Koc asked the favour of the Istanbul Chief of Police, Sabri Caglayangil, who later became a Minister of the Interior. On February 23, 1942, with her engine inoperable and her refugee passengers aboard, Turkish authorities towed Struma from Istanbul Harbour through the Bosphorus back to the Black Sea, where they set her adrift without food, water or fuel.

The documentary won the Audience Award at the Portland International Film Festival for best documentary.

Expulsion and Memory: Descendants of the Hidden Jews 
In the 1996 documentary, Jacobovici studies the Crypto-Jews of New Mexico and tiny populations of Jewish descendants in Spain and Portugal, known as nuevos Cristianos ("new Christians"). He explores the Jewish ancestry of the New Mexican Hispanic families now living in New Mexico and finds that many of them have always been aware of their Jewish heritage.

Falasha: Exile of the Black Jews 
In the 1983 documentary Falasha: Exile of the Black Jews, Jacobovici tells the story of Ethiopian Jews, also called Falasha (strangers) and properly known as Beta Israel. According to the documentary, the group was conquered by neighbouring tribes in the 17th century and suffered persecution.\

References

External links 
 Associated Producers Ltd.
 Associated Producers Ltd. – Simcha Jacobovici
 
 Official Site for The Lost Tomb of Jesus
 Simcha Jacobovici honors his father
 Simcha Jacobovici Interview

1953 births
Living people
Canadian documentary film directors
21st-century Canadian male writers
Canadian Orthodox Jews
Canadian people of Romanian-Jewish descent
Israeli emigrants to Canada
Israeli Orthodox Jews
Jewish Canadian writers
Pseudoarchaeologists
Pseudohistorians
People from Petah Tikva
Emmy Award winners
21st-century Canadian non-fiction writers
Directors of Genie and Canadian Screen Award winners for Best Documentary Film
Historical theories and materials on the Exodus
Jewish Canadian filmmakers
Canadian Screen Award winning journalists